Suburbs of Auckland was a parliamentary electorate in Auckland, New Zealand from 1853 to 1860.

Population centres
Suburbs of Auckland covered the area close and adjacent to the city of Auckland. Those suburbs were east, south and west of the city and covered Parnell, Newmarket, Grey Lynn, and Ponsonby. To the east, the Suburbs of Auckland electorate bordered the Southern Division electorate. To the south and west, the boundary was with the Northern Division electorate. In the north, the Suburbs of Auckland electorate wrapped itself around the City of Auckland electorate or it bordered onto the Waitemata Harbour. For the 1853 general election, there were 163 electors on the roll. This had increased to 325 electors for the 1855 general election.

History
The electorate was represented by six members of parliament. The 1853 nomination meetings for the City of Auckland, Suburbs of Auckland, and Northern Division electorates were all held at the Market Place in Shortland Street in Auckland city. At the nomination meeting on 10 August 1853, Frederick Merriman and William Field Porter were proposed. As two positions had to be filled, they were declared elected unopposed.

The 1855 nomination meetings for the City of Auckland, Suburbs of Auckland, and Northern Division electorates were all held opposite the court house, one after the other, on 16 October. There were four candidates for the two positions, and a poll was held on 27 October. Merriman, the only incumbent to stand, topped the poll, and the other successful candidate was Walter Brodie.

Brodie resigned on 6 December 1859. Hargreaves was elected on 5 April 1860, and resigned on 24 July 1860. He was replaced by Campbell, who was returned unopposed on 4 August 1860. Merriman resigned on 13 March 1860.

Members

The electorate existed for the 1st and 2nd Parliament as a two-member electorate.

Election results

1855 election

Footnotes

Notes

References

 

Historical electorates of New Zealand
Politics of the Auckland Region
1853 establishments in New Zealand
1860 disestablishments in New Zealand